Tangnaihai Township (Mandarin: 唐乃亥乡) is a township in Xinghai County, Hainan Tibetan Autonomous Prefecture, Qinghai, China. In 2010, Tangnaihai Township had a total population of 8,678 people: 4,411 males and 4,267 females: 2,485 under 14 years old, 5,746 aged between 15 and 64 and 447 over 65 years old.

References 

Township-level divisions of Qinghai
Hainan Tibetan Autonomous Prefecture